María del Socorro Flores Liera (born 15 September 1965) known as Socorro Flores  is a  Mexican lawyer, diplomat and a judge of the International Criminal Court (ICC) in The Hague. She was Mexico Permanent Representative to the United Nations.

Early and education 
Flores Liera was born in Mexico City. She studied Law at the Universidad Iberoamericana and obtained advanced degree in International Law from University Autonomous.

Career 
She started her diplomatic career in1992 when she joined the Ministry of Foreign Relations and rose through the ranks to the position of Director of International Law in the Legal Consultancy and Coordinator of Advisors in the Undersecretariat for Multilateral Affairs and Human Rights. As a diplomat, she was in charge of the Mexican delegation involved in the negotiations which lead to the Rome Statute in 1998 and in consequence to the establishment of the International Criminal Court. She was the head of the General Directorate for Global Issues (DGTG) and General Director of American Regional Organizations and Mechanisms (DGOMRA) from 2013 to 2015. In 2017, she was appointed Mexicos Permanent Representative to the United Nations in Geneva Switzerland. She was elected Judge of the International Criminal Court by the Assembly of States Parties to the ICC following the Court's Independent Expert Report which showed that Liera received the highest rating and the highest number of votes among 18 contenders. She was sworn in to the court on 10 March 2021.

References 

Living people
1965 births
Mexican women diplomats
20th-century Mexican lawyers
International Criminal Court judges
21st-century Mexican judges
Universidad Iberoamericana alumni
Permanent Representatives of Mexico to the United Nations